The stratopause (formerly mesopeak) is the level of the atmosphere which is the boundary between two layers: the stratosphere and the mesosphere. In the stratosphere, the temperature increases with altitude, and the stratopause is the region where a maximum in the temperature occurs. This atmospheric feature is not exclusive to Earth, but also occurs on any other planet or moon with an atmosphere.

See also
 Jet stream
 Maximum parcel level

References

External links
 

Atmospheric boundaries